Wipers Box Set is a compilation box set, comprising remastered reissues of the first three albums by punk rock band Wipers: Is This Real?, Youth of America and Over the Edge. The collection includes 23 bonus tracks, including six previously unreleased songs, as well as liner notes by leader Greg Sage.

Track listing

Disc 1: Is This Real?
"Return of the Rat" - 2:38
"Mystery" - 1:47
"Up Front" - 3:04
"Let's Go Away" - 1:48
"Is This Real?" - 2:39
"Tragedy" - 2:00
"D-7" - 4:04
"Potential Suicide" - 3:34
"Don't Know What I Am" - 2:56
"Window Shop for Love" - 2:59
"Wait a Minute" - 3:04
"Born with a Curse" (previously unreleased) - 1:48
"Rebel with a Cause" (Is This Real? outtake) - 2:11
"Misfit" (previously unreleased) - 1:35
"Mystery" (original 4-track version) - 1:46
"Tragedy" (original 4-track version) - 2:11
"Let's Go Away" (original 4-track version) - 1:52
"Is This Real?" (original 4-track version) - 2:40
"Alien Boy" - 3:23
"Image of Man" - 2:29
"Telepathic Love" - 1:32
"Voices in the Rain" - 1:24
 1-11: Is This Real?
 19-22: Alien Boy EP

Disc 2: Youth of America
"No Fair" - 4:25
"Youth of America" - 10:27
"Taking Too Long" - 3:07
"Can This Be" - 2:54
"Pushing the Extreme" - 3:13
"When It's Over" - 6:36
"Scared Stiff" (previously unreleased) - 2:52
"Pushing the Extreme" (alternate mix) - 3:11
"No Fair" (alternate mix) - 4:34
"When It's Over" (early version) - 6:26
"Youth of America" (alternate mix) - 10:27
 1-6: Youth of AmericaDisc 3: Over the Edge
"Over the Edge" - 3:49
"Doom Town" - 3:56
"So Young" - 4:17
"Messenger" - 1:54
"Romeo" - 4:05
"Now Is the Time" - 3:02
"What Is" - 2:19
"No One Wants an Alien" - 3:23
"The Lonely One" - 3:38
"No Generation Gap" - 3:09
"This Time" - 2:54
"Mistaken ID" (live) - 3:05
"No Solution" ("Romeo" B-side) - 2:30
"Doom Town" (alternate mix) - 3:56
"The Lonely One" (alternate mix) - 3:37
"Now Is the Time" (alternate mix) - 3:04
"Romeo" (alternate vocal mix) - 4:05
"Our Past Life" (demo) - 1:29
 1-11: Over the Edge''

References 

Wipers albums
2001 compilation albums